Ezequiel Alberto Rodríguez (born 19 March 1980) is an Argentine former professional footballer who played as a forward.

Career
Rodríguez started his career with Almirante Brown, scoring five times in eighty-one Primera B Metropolitana matches between 2000 and 2003. He departed in 2003 to play for fellow Primera B Metropolitana team Deportivo Armenio, subsequently featuring twenty times and scoring once in the 2003–04 Primera B Metropolitana campaign. 2005 saw Rodríguez leave Argentine football for three years in Bolivia. He had a short spell with Fancesa of Liga Nacional B, before joining Universitario de Sucre in the Bolivian Primera División months later. He scored twelve goals in three years, winning the 2008 Apertura in his final season.

He returned to Argentina in 2009 to play for Central Córdoba. He went on to play in ten matches for them in Torneo Argentino A, scoring three goals against Sportivo Desamparados, Deportivo Maipú and Gimnasia y Esgrima respectively. Between 2012 and 2015, Rodríguez spent time with Torneo Argentino B/Torneo Federal B sides Sportivo Rivadavia, Deportivo Patagones and Maronese; he had two separate spells with Deportivo Patagones, who he played for last in 2015.

Career statistics
.

Honours
Universitario de Sucre
Bolivian Primera División: 2008 Apertura

References

External links

1980 births
Living people
People from Santiago del Estero
Argentine footballers
Association football forwards
Argentine expatriate footballers
Expatriate footballers in Bolivia
Argentine expatriate sportspeople in Bolivia
Primera B Metropolitana players
Bolivian Primera División players
Torneo Argentino A players
Torneo Argentino B players
Club Almirante Brown footballers
Deportivo Armenio footballers
Universitario de Sucre footballers
Central Córdoba de Santiago del Estero footballers
Sportspeople from Santiago del Estero Province